Warialda railway station is a disused railway station  SW of , New South Wales, Australia on the Inverell railway line  NNW of Sydney ( by rail).

References

External links

 
 Trove search Warialda Rail Inverell

Railway stations in Australia opened in 1901
Railway stations closed in 1985
Disused regional railway stations in New South Wales